Sixth Street Historic District may refer to:

in the United States
(by state)
 Sixth Street Historic District (Grandin, Missouri), listed on the NRHP in Missouri
 Sixth Street Historic District (Portsmouth, Ohio), listed on the NRHP in Ohio
 Sixth Street Historic District (Austin, Texas), listed on the NRHP in Texas
 Sixth Street Historic District (Hudson, Wisconsin), listed on the NRHP in Wisconsin

Douglas-Sixth Street Historic District, Las Vegas, NM, listed on the NRHP in New Mexico
Historic Sixth Street Business District, Racine, WI, listed on the NRHP in Wisconsin
South Sixth Street Historic District, Poplar Bluff, MO, listed on the NRHP in Missouri
US Route 66--Sixth Street Historic District, Amarillo, TX, listed on the NRHP in Texas
West Fifth Street-West Sixth Street Historic District, Marshfield, WI, listed on the NRHP in Wisconsin
West Sixth Street and Mayes Place Historic District, Columbia, TN, listed on the NRHP in Tennessee
West Sixth Street Historic District, Erie, PA, listed on the NRHP in Pennsylvania